Ouissem Belgacem (born 1988) is a French former high performance athlete and writer of Tunisian origin. He played football for Toulouse FC from the ages of 13 to 18 years old. He published his first autobiographical novel, Adieu ma honte, in 2021. Belgacem often raises awareness about homophobia in the field of football, which he had to leave in order to live his sexuality freely.

Early life 
Belgacem was born in 1988 in the suburbs of Aix-en-Provence in France. In his family of Tunisian origin, he is the youngest of four sisters. He was seduced by football and started playing as a defender in local clubs before he was spotted at 13 years old by the training center Toulouse FC (TFC). Since Belgacem joined TFC, he worked towards becoming a professional football player while hiding his homosexuality as he realized that the field would not accept it. He also felt this homophobia when he played in the Tunisian national team for the Africa Cup of Nations of 2004 and some clubs in the United States:Every day, I would leave my bedroom, put on a mask, and act as a straight man. It's exhausting to do this every day.

— Ouissem BelgacemHence, he grew up being ashamed and making sure to hide his homosexuality which made him depressed and pushed him to abandon his dream of becoming a professional athlete.

Career after football 
Belgacem then moved to London where he does not feel shame about his sexuality anymore. Now openly gay, he published his autobiography, Adieu ma honte, in 2021 to spark conversations about homophobia in the field of sports. In this first novel, Belgacem reveals the hardships of accepting one's homosexuality when living in a working-class neighborhood, growing up in a Muslim family, and making progress in the field of football. He has given interventions in numerous awareness raising events against homophobia in football since the release of his book; including events with the players of TFC, the players of Amiens SC, and the members of the equality club in the Lycée Intercommunal Darius-Milhaud in Kremlin-Bicêtre.

Belgacem is also the owner of the company OnTrack Sport which supports high performance athletes in the management of their after-careers.

Awards 
 Narrative autobiography award, at the Prix du roman gay 2021.

Works 
 Ouissem Belgacem and Eléonore Gurrey, Adieu ma honte, Paris, Fayard, 2021.

References 

French footballers
1988 births
LGBT association football players
French male novelists
French LGBT novelists
French people of Tunisian descent
Tunisian LGBT people
Living people
Tunisian LGBT rights activists
French LGBT rights activists